The 1885–86 season was the first season in the history of Luton Town Football Club. The club had been in existence for less than three months on the season's start, and as Luton did not enter any league competition the team's first competitive match came on 31 October, an FA Cup tie against Great Marlow which was lost 3–0.

This article covers the period from 1 July 1885 to 30 June 1886.

Background

Luton Town Football Club was formed on 11 April 1885 at a meeting convened "for the purpose of considering the advisability of forming a town football club". The new club was a merger of the two leading local teams, Luton Town Wanderers and Excelsior; Excelsior's Dallow Lane became the home stadium of the new club. Some of the Wanderers players were not enthusiastic, as they had extended their name to Luton Town Wanderers only three months before; these players made the decision to continue separately to the new amalgamated club. Despite this, Luton Town's early line-ups consisted of six players from one of the former clubs and five from the other.

Review

Luton Town played only one competitive match during the season, an FA Cup first round tie at Great Marlow which was lost 3–0.

Match results 

Luton Town results given first.

Legend

FA Cup

Player details
As the match played on 31 October 1885 was the only competitive game of the season, this section merely details that match's line-up.

See also
1885–86 in English football

References
General
Player and match statistics sourced from: 
All else sourced from: 
and 
Specific

Luton Town F.C. seasons
Luton Town